Vulpia is a widespread genus of plants in the grass family, native to many countries around the world and naturalized in many of the nations to which it is not native. It is most common in temperate regions.

Vulpia is a part of a group of species known as fescues; Vulpia is sometimes considered a subset of the main fescue genus, Festuca. Many of these fescues are considered noxious weeds in many places. Vulpia myuros is a notable weed.

The genus is named for Johann Samuel Vulpius (1760-1846), a German botanist.

 Species
 Vulpia alopecuros (Schousb.) Link - western Mediterranean, Canary Is
 Vulpia alpina L.Liu - Tibet
 Vulpia antucensis Trin. - Chile, Argentina
 Vulpia australis (Nees) Blom - South America
 Vulpia brevis Boiss. & Kotschy - eastern Mediterranean
 Vulpia bromoides (L.) Gray - brome fescue - Europe, Africa, Arabia; naturalized in Australia, the Americas, various islands
 Vulpia ciliata Dumort. - Europe, North Africa, central + southwestern Asia; introduced in Australia, New Zealand, Pennsylvania
 Vulpia cynosuroides (Desf.) Parl. - Algeria, Morocco, Tunisia
 Vulpia delicatula (Lag.) Dumort. - Portugal, Spain
 Vulpia elliotea (Raf.) Fernald - squirreltail fescue - southeastern USA (Texas to New Jersey)
 Vulpia fasciculata (Forssk.) Samp. - western Europe, Mediterranean, Caucasus; introduced in Australia, South Africa
 Vulpia fontquerana Melderis & Stace - Spain
 Vulpia geniculata (L.) Link - Mediterranean, Sweden, Britain, Canary Islands, Madeira
 Vulpia gracilis H.Scholz - Tunisia, Libya
 Vulpia gypsophila (Hack.) Nyman - Spain, Sicily
 Vulpia ligustica (All.) Link - Mediterranean
 Vulpia litardiereana (Maire) A.Camus - Morocco
 Vulpia membranacea (L.) Dumort. - Mediterranean
 Vulpia microstachys (Nutt.) Munro - small fescue - western USA, British Columbia, Baja California (incl Guadalupe Island), Peru
 Vulpia muralis (Kunth) Nees - Mediterranean, Azores, Canary Islands, Balkans, Hungary, Saudi Arabia; introduced in Australia, scattered locales in South America
 Vulpia myuros (L.) C.C.Gmel. - rat-tail fescue - Africa, Eurasia; introduced in Australia, the Americas, various islands
 Vulpia octoflora (Walter) Rydb. - widespread in North America; also Chile + Argentina
 Vulpia pectinella (Delile) Boiss. - North Africa, Middle East from Morocco to Iraq
 Vulpia persica (Boiss. & Buhse) Krecz. & Bobrov - Asia from Saudi Arabia to Kazakhstan
 Vulpia sicula (J.Presl) Link - Mediterranean
 Vulpia unilateralis (L.) Stace - from Britain to Morocco + Tajikistan

 formerly included
Numerous species once considered part of Vulpia but now regarded as better suited to other genera: Anthosachne Australopyrum Avellinia Festuca Micropyrum Vulpiella

References

Pooideae
Poaceae genera
Grasses of Africa
Grasses of Asia
Grasses of Europe
Grasses of North America
Grasses of South America